Punjabi Muslims are adherents of Islam who identify linguistically, culturally, and genealogically as Punjabis. Primarily geographically native to the Punjab province of Pakistan today, many have ancestry in the entire Punjab region, split between India and Pakistan in the contemporary era.

Forming the majority of the Punjabi ethnicity in the greater Punjab region (overall in the South Asia), Punjabi Muslims speak or identify the Punjabi language (under a Perso-Arabic script known as Shahmukhi) as a mother tongue. With a population of more than 109 million, they are the largest ethnic group in Pakistan and the world's third-largest Islam-adhering ethnicity after Arabs and Bengalis. The majority of Punjabi Muslims are adherents of Sunni Islam, while a minority adhere to Shia Islam.

History

Early Period
At the advent of Islam, Punjab was part of Taank Kingdom. According to local traditions, Baba Ratan Hindi, who was a trader from Bhatinda, Punjab, was one of the Sahaba of Prophet Muhammad. He was later ordered by Prophet Muhammad to return to his homeland, where his shrine exists till today at Bhatinda. However, Islam was introduced via southern Punjab in the 8th century, becoming the majority by the 16th century, via local conversion. While Punjabi Hindu society was relatively well established by that time, there was a small Jain community left in Punjab by the 16th century, while the Buddhist community had largely disappeared by the turn of the 10th century. In the 11th century, last Hindu dynasty of Punjab, Hindu Shahis was defeated and annexed into Ghaznavid Empire. The city of Lahore emerged as a cultural and academic centre during this era and effectively acted as second capital of the empire. Under their patronage, poets and scholars from Kashgar, Bukhara, Samarkand, Baghdad, Nishapur, Amol and Ghazni congregated in the region. The region became predominantly Muslim due to missionary Sufi saints whose dargahs dot the landscape of the Punjab region. Fariduddin Ganjshakar was a 12th century Punjabi Muslim saint and first major poet of Punjabi language, upon whose hand many people, specifically Khokhars converted to Islam.

Medieval Period
After Muhammad Ghori was allegedly assassinated by Khokhar tribesmen, one of his slaves, Qutb-ud-din Aibak established Delhi Sultanate and so Punjab became its part. The early period of Delhi Sultanate saw numerous Mongol invasions of Punjab. Ultimately, they were defeated during the rule of Khalji dynasty by its able generals, Zafar Khan and Ayn al-Mulk Multani.

Ghazi Malik rose to the throne with the support of the Khokhar chiefs, establishing the Tughlaq Dynasty of the Delhi Sultanate. During his reign, the Tughlaq Court produced a war ballad known as the Vaar in the Punjabi language for the Sultan describing the introduction to his rise to the throne against Khusrau Shah. The second ruler, Jauna Khan married his daughter to the grandson of the Punjabi saint Fariduddin Ganjshakar. Successive leading Tughlaq Sultans continued to merge the symbols of the Baba Farid shrine and the royal court by weaving the Punjabi Dastar-bandi ceremony of the shrine with succession to the throne.

In 1398, Emir Timur invaded Delhi Sultanate and plundered Delhi. Taking advantage of ensuing chaos, Khizr Khan, who was probably a Punjabi chieftain, became Sultan of Delhi in 1414. His native town was Fathpur in Punjab which was near Multan and he was the founder of the Sayyid dynasty, the fourth dynasty of the Delhi Sultanate after the fall of the Tughlaqs. The governor of Nagaur, Rajasthan under the Delhi Sultanate and later the independent Nagaur Sultanate was Jalal Khan Khokhar. The hold of Delhi sultanate was weakened considerably in Punjab at this time as well as in other regions. In 1407, Sultan Muzaffar Shah I, who was from Punjab, declared independence and established the Gujarat Sultanate. In 1445, Sultan Qutbudin, chief of Langah tribe became ruler of the Langah Sultanate in Multan. 

The region of Potohar in north of Punjab was for most of time independent of foreign rule .One of its major chieftains was Jasrath Khokhar who helped Sultan Zain Ul Abideen of Kashmir to gain his throne and ruled over vast tracts of Jammu and North Punjab. He also conquered Delhi for a brief period in 1431 but was driven out by Mubarak Shah. The last Pothohari Sultan, Sultan Muqarrab Khan maintained local independence for most of 18th century by resisting Afghans and Sikhs.

Mughal Period 
In 1525, Babur the first Mughal emperor received invitations from Daulat Khan Lodi, Governor of Punjab. He later made alliance with Ghakkar chieftains of Pothohar and invaded Hindustan. This alliance was the reason later Sher Shah Suri invaded Pothohar and Sultan Sarang Khan Ghakkar died fighting against him. Later, he ordered the construction of Rohtas fort in the region to keep an eye on the local tribes, which is a UNESCO World Heritage Site now.

The Mughals divided Punjab into Subah of Lahore and Subah of Multan. During the Mughal era, Saadullah Khan, belonging to the Thaheem tribe from Chiniot remained Grand vizier (or Prime Minister) of the Mughal empire in the period 1645-1656. Multiple Punjabi Muslims acted as governors and generals during the Mughal Era including Wazir Khan, Adina Beg Arain, and Shahbaz Khan Kamboh. Sayyid brothers, the famous kingmakers of early 18th century had ancestral roots in Punjab, their father Syed Mian was a leading Mughal noble in Aurangzeb's reign and remained the governor of Bijapur and Ajmer. Despite such high representation in Mughal nobility, the landlord gentry resisted and challenged the empire on multiple occasions. For instance, Dulla Bhatti was a 16th century Punjabi folk hero who supposedly led a revolt against Mughal rule during the reign of the Mughal emperor Akbar.

During these centuries of Mughal rule, Punjabi Muslims established centers of Islamic civilization in cities and towns such as Lahore and Sialkot, and Punjabi Muslim scholars were "in high demand", teaching the Islamic sciences as far as Central Asia, in cities such as Bukhara, even being considered there as native saints within their lifetimes. Influential Muslim scholars born in Punjab during the Mughal period include Abdul Hakim Sialkot and Ahmad Sirhindi.

Sikh Period
Punjabi Muslims viewed Sikh rule as a dark period of history. The mid 19th-century Punjabi Muslim historians, such as Shahamat Ali who experienced the Sikh Empire first hand, presented a different view on Ranjit Singh's Empire and governance. According to Ali, Ranjit Singh's government was despotic, and he was a mean monarch in contrast to the Mughals. The initial momentum for the Empire building in these accounts is stated to be Ranjit Singh led Khalsa army's "insatiable appetite for plunder", their desire for "fresh cities to pillage", and eliminating the Mughal era "revenue intercepting intermediaries between the peasant-cultivator and the treasury".

According to Ishtiaq Ahmed, Ranjit Singh's rule led to further persecution of Muslims in Kashmir, expanding the previously selective persecution of Shia Muslims and Hindus by Afghan Sunni Muslim rulers between 1752 and 1819 before Kashmir became part of his Sikh Empire. Bikramjit Hasrat describes Ranjit Singh as a "benevolent despot". Chitralekha Zutshi and William Roe Polk write that Sikh governors adopted policies that alienated the Muslim population such as the ban on cow slaughter and the azan (the Islamic call to prayer), the seizure of mosques as property of the state, and imposed ruinous taxes on Kashmiri Muslims causing a famine in 1832. In addition, begar (forced labour) was imposed by the Sikh administration to facilitate the supply of materials to the imperial army, a policy that was augmented by the successive Dogra rulers. As a symbolic assertion of power, the Sikhs regularly desecrated Muslim places of worship, including closing of the Jamia Masjid in Srinagar and the conversion of the Badshahi Mosque in Lahore to an ammunition store and horse stable, but the empire still maintained Persian administrative institutions and court etiquette; the Sikh silver rupees were minted on the Mughal standard with Persian legends.

In her 2022-book Muslims under Sikh Rule in the Nineteenth Century, Dr. Robina Yasmin, a Pakistani historian who teaches at the Islamia University Bahawalpur, tries to give a balanced picture of Ranjit Singh, between the contradictory images of "a great secular ruler" and that of "an extremist Sikh who was bent upon eliminating Islam in the Punjab", Dr. Robina Yasmin's own assessment after her study being that Ranjit Singh himself was tolerant and secular and that the mistreatment of the Muslim population often ascribed to him based on dubious anecdotes in fact came from his subordinates.

Colonial Period 
During the colonial era, the practice of religious syncretism among Punjabi Muslims and Punjabi Hindus was noted and documented by officials in census reports:

War of Independence (1857)
The news of Indian Rebellion of 1857 reached in Punjab quite late. Jhelum in Punjab saw a rebellion in which 35 British soldiers were killed on 7 July 1857. Among the dead was Captain Francis Spring, the eldest son of Colonel William Spring. On 9 July, most of a brigade of sepoys at Sialkot rebelled and began to move to Delhi. They were intercepted by John Nicholson with an equal British force as they tried to cross the Ravi River. After fighting steadily but unsuccessfully for several hours, the sepoys tried to fall back across the river but became trapped on an island, they were defeated by Nicholson in the Battle of Trimmu Ghat. However, the main opponent of the British rule in Punjab was Rai Ahmad Khan Kharal who waged war against it for three months in central Punjab. He was de facto ruler of Jhamra. He was killed on 21 September,1 1857  in the Battle of Noorey di Dall while inflicting heavy losses to the British. However, the rebellion died out eventually.

In the British Indian Army
Punjabi Muslims, classified as a "martial race" by the British colonialists, made a substantial part of the British Indian Army, British academic David Omissi calling them the single largest group in both World Wars, at the eve of World War II accounting for around 29% of its total numbers. 

British appreciation for such support is seen for example through the assessment of Lt-Gen Sir George MacMunn, who wrote in 1932 that the Punjabi Muslim "forms the backbone of the Indian army to-day, and is perhaps the most useful and attractive of any of our soldiers. His fighting reputation has been considerably enhanced by the Great War."

Despite such collaboration, there was also a history of popular resistance from Punjabi Muslims against British colonialism, including during the 1857 Indian Rebellion with the likes of Rai Ahmad Khan Kharal, facts which historian Turab-ul-Hassan Sargana says have been undermined because the elites of Punjab who collaborated with the British are those who still rule Pakistan today.

When it comes to the ethnography and caste-affiliation of Punjabi Muslims, in his 1911-book The Armies of India, British major Sir George Fletcher MacMunn would write that they "are of many mixed races, but who largely consist of Rajput tribes converted to Islam at various times in the past."

Administrative Reforms
The Government of India Act 1935 introduced provincial autonomy to Punjab replacing the system of dyarchy. It provided for the constitution of Punjab Legislative Assembly of 175 members presided by a Speaker and an executive government responsible to the Assembly. The Unionist Party under a Punjabi Muslim, Sir Sikandar Hayat Khan formed the government in 1937. Sir Sikandar was succeeded by Malik Khizar Hayat Tiwana in 1942 who remained the Premier till partition in 1947. Although the term of the Assembly was five years, the Assembly continued for about eight years and its last sitting was held on 19 March 1945.

Culture

Sufism
Sufism has also played a major role in the history of Punjab. Many prominent Sufi saints were born in Punjab, including Waris Shah, Fariduddin Ganjshakar and Bulleh Shah.

Language
Punjabi Muslims had a major contribution in the development of Punjabi language. Fariduddin Ganjshakar (1179–1266) is generally recognised as the first major poet of the Punjabi language. Roughly from the 12th century to the 19th century, many great Sufi saints and poets preached in the Punjabi language, the most prominent being Bulleh Shah. Punjabi Sufi poetry also developed under Shah Hussain (1538–1599), Sultan Bahu (1630–1691), Shah Sharaf (1640–1724),  Ali Haider (1690–1785), Waris Shah (1722–1798), Saleh Muhammad Safoori (1747–1826), Mian Muhammad Baksh (1830–1907) and Khwaja Ghulam Farid (1845–1901).

Literature

The Punjabi language is famous for its rich literature of qisse, most of which are about love, passion, betrayal, sacrifice, social values and a common man's revolt against a larger system. The qissa of Heer Ranjha by Waris Shah (1706–1798) is among the most popular of Punjabi qissas. Other popular stories include Sohni Mahiwal by Fazal Shah, Mirza Sahiban by Hafiz Barkhudar (1658–1707), Sassui Punnhun by Hashim Shah (c. 1735–c. 1843), and Qissa Puran Bhagat by Qadaryar (1802–1892). In contrast to Persian poets, who had preferred the ghazal for poetic expression, Punjabi Sufi poets tended to compose in the Kafi.

Music

Punjabi music is used by western musicians in many ways, such as mixing with other compositions to produce award-winning music. Sufi music and Qawali, commonly practiced in Punjab, Pakistan; are other important genres in the Punjab region. 

Folk music of Punjab is the traditional music of Punjab produced using traditional musical instruments like Tumba, Algoza, Dhadd, Sarangi, Chimta and more. There is a wide range of folk songs for every occasion from birth to death including marriage, festivals, fairs and religious ceremonies.

Demographics
While the total population of Punjab is 110 million as noted in the 2017 Pakistan census, ethnic Punjabis comprise approximately 44.7% of the national population. With an estimated national population of 243 million in 2022, ethnic Punjabis thus number approximately 108.5 million in Pakistan; this makes Punjabis the largest ethnic group in Pakistan by population.

Religious homogeneity remains elusive as a predominant Sunni population with Shia, Ahmadiyya and Christian minorities.

Among the Punjabi Muslims in Pakistan in terms of group-affiliation percentages, Barelvis make up 77.95% of the total numbers, Deobandis are at 12.92%, Ahl-i Hadith at 6.50% while Shia's are at 2.62%.

The major Muslim Punjabi tribes of are the Jatts, Rajputs, Arains, Gujjars and Awans.
Punjabi Muslims are found almost exclusively in Pakistan with 97% of Punjabis who live in Pakistan following Islam, in contrast to Punjabi Sikhs and Punjabi Hindus who predominantly live in India.

See also
 History of Punjab
 List of Punjabi Muslims
 Jat Muslim
 Punjabi people
 List of Rulers of Pothohar Plateau
 Islam in Pakistan
 Punjabi Christians
 Punjabi Sikhs
 Punjabi Hindus
 Shahmukhi alphabet, the script used by Punjabi Muslims to read and write Punjabi

Notes

References

 
Ethnic groups in Pakistan
Demographics of Punjab, Pakistan
Muslims by ethnicity